Leonel Jesús Vangioni Rangel (born 5 May 1987) is an Argentine footballer who plays as a left-back for Newell's Old Boys in the Argentine Primera División. Vangioni is known for scoring the decisive penalty that won Monterrey the Apertura 2019 tournament against Club América.

Club career
His grandfather, Davide Roca, originated from Riesi in the Province of Caltanissetta, Sicily. Vangioni made his professional debut for Newell's in November 2006 and soon established himself as an important member of the first team squad. He scored his first goal in a game against San Lorenzo de Almagro on 4 August 2007. He moved to River Plate in January 2013 for a fee around €1.1 million.

On 14 February 2016, it was announced that Vangioni would be joining Italian club Milan on the expiration of his River contract in July. On 16 January 2017, Vangioni made his debut with Milan, coming as a substitute for Davide Calabria in a 2–2 draw against Torino.

On 21 July 2017, it was announced that he would sign for Monterrey.

Libertad
On 19 October 2020, D10 announced that Vangioni had signed with Club Libertad in the Primera División Paraguaya. Libertad officially presented Vangioni through Social Media as he arrive from Liga MX club Monterrey, where he was teammates with Paraguayan Celso Ortiz.

International career

Vangioni was called up to the Argentina national team for the first time to play a friendly match against Ghana on 30 September 2009. In 2012, he took part in both legs of the Superclásico de las Américas.

Career statistics

Club

International
.

Honours

River Plate
 Argentina Primera Division (1): 2014 Final
 Copa Campeonato (1): 2013–14
 Copa Sudamericana (1): 2014
 Recopa Sudamericana (1): 2015
 Copa Libertadores (1): 2015
 Suruga Bank Championship (1): 2015

Milan
 Supercoppa Italiana (1): 2016

Monterrey
 Liga MX (1): Apertura 2019
 Copa MX (1): Apertura 2017
 CONCACAF Champions League (1): 2019

Individual
 Liga MX Best XI: Apertura 2017

References

External links
  Argentine Primera statistics at Fútbol XXI
 Football-Lineups player profile
 espndeportes.espn.go.com

1987 births
Living people
People from Constitución Department
Argentine footballers
Argentine expatriate footballers
Association football wingers
Argentine people of Sicilian descent
Argentina international footballers
Newell's Old Boys footballers
Club Atlético River Plate footballers
A.C. Milan players
C.F. Monterrey players
Club Libertad footballers
Argentine Primera División players
Paraguayan Primera División players
Liga MX players
Serie A players
Argentine expatriate sportspeople in Italy
Argentine expatriate sportspeople in Mexico
Argentine expatriate sportspeople in Paraguay
Expatriate footballers in Italy
Expatriate footballers in Mexico
Expatriate footballers in Paraguay
Sportspeople from Santa Fe Province